Achraf Tadili (born July 8, 1980 in Casablanca, Morocco) is a Canadian athlete competing over 800 metres. He competed at the 2004 and 2008 Olympic Games.

Achievements

References

External links
 
 
 
 
 
 
 

1980 births
Living people
Canadian male middle-distance runners
Olympic track and field athletes of Canada
Athletes (track and field) at the 2003 Pan American Games
Athletes (track and field) at the 2004 Summer Olympics
Athletes (track and field) at the 2008 Summer Olympics
Athletes (track and field) at the 2006 Commonwealth Games
Commonwealth Games silver medallists for Canada
Moroccan emigrants to Canada
Sportspeople from Casablanca
Pan American Games track and field athletes for Canada
Commonwealth Games medallists in athletics
Pan American Games medalists in athletics (track and field)
Pan American Games gold medalists for Canada
Medalists at the 2003 Pan American Games
Medallists at the 2006 Commonwealth Games